Balika Badhu (Hindi: बालिका बधू; translation: Child Bride) is a 1976 Hindi romantic comedy-drama film produced by Shakti Samanta and directed by Tarun Majumdar. The film is based on the Bengali novel by the same name by Bimal Kar, about a young girl who is married before she is old enough to understand what marriage is all about, against the backdrop of Indian freedom struggle. Gradually she and her school-going husband grow as a couple and begin to love one another. The film was previously made into a Bengali film, Balika Badhu (1967), starring Moushumi Chatterjee, by Tarun Majumdar himself.

This romantic comedy drama stars Sachin with Rajni Sharma, Asrani, A. K. Hangal, Asit Sen, Paintal and Om Shivpuri. Initially Debashree Roy was offered to play the titular role but Majumdar later considered her to be imperfect to play the role and she got replaced by Rajni Sharma. The music is by R. D. Burman and lyrics by Anand Bakshi, who penned several hits in the film including "Bade Achchhe Lagte Hain...", which was singer Amit Kumar's first hit, and featured on the Binaca Geetmala annual list 1977 at # 26. It was the second film of Mrityunjay Sil.

Cast
Sachin as Amal
Mrityunjay Sil as Rahul 
Rajni Sharma as Rajni
Kajri as Chandra
Asrani as Sharat
A. K. Hangal as Masterji
Prema Narayan as Radhiya
Om Shivpuri as Amal's father
Urmila Bhatt as Amal's mother
Kajri as Chandra, Amal's sister 
Paintal as Shambhu
Asit Sen as Udasu
Preeti Ganguli as Nandini
S. N. Banerjee as Pandit
Birbal as Imported bangle seller
Polson as School teacher
Ashok Kumar as Aged Amal's voice
Amitabh Bachchan as Adult Amal's voice
Zeenat Aman as Adult Rajni's voice
Leela Mishra as grannie

Crew
Director - Tarun Majumdar
Story - Bimal Kar
Screenplay - Tarun Majumdar
Dialogue - Shabd Kumar
Producer - Shakti Samanta
Editor - Bijoy Chowdhury
Cinematographer - Nandu Bhattacharya

Music
Song "Bade Achhe Lagte Hain" was Amit Kumar's first hit song and listed at #26 on the Binaca Geetmala annual list 1977.

Awards

 24th Filmfare Awards:

Won

 Best Supporting Actress – Kajari
 Best Comedian – Asrani
 Best Editing – Bijoy Chowdhury

References

External links 
 

Films scored by R. D. Burman
1976 films
1970s Hindi-language films
Films directed by Tarun Majumdar
Films based on Indian novels
Child marriage in India
Hindi remakes of Bengali films